Església de Santa Bàrbara d'Ordino  is a church located in Ordino Parish, Andorra. It is a heritage property registered in the Cultural Heritage of Andorra. It was built in the 17th century.

References

Ordino
Roman Catholic churches in Andorra
Cultural Heritage of Andorra